Argyrophylax is a genus of flies in the family Tachinidae.

Species
A. albincisus (Wiedemann, 1830)
A. aptus (Walker, 1859)
A. basifulva Bezzi, 1925
A. bisetosa Thompson, 1963
A. cinerella Mensil, 1953
A. fransseni (Baranov, 1934)
A. nigrotibialis Baranov, 1935
A. phoedus (Townsend, 1927)
A. proclinata Crosskey, 1963
A. purpurescens Townsend, 1929
A. solomonicus (Baranov, 1938)

References

Tachinidae genera
Exoristinae
Taxa named by Friedrich Moritz Brauer
Taxa named by Julius von Bergenstamm